Solid acids are acids that are insoluble in the reaction medium. They are often used as heterogeneous catalysts.

Examples
Most solid state acids are organic acids such as oxalic acid, tartaric acid, citric acid, maleic acid, etc. Examples of inorganic solid acids include silico-aluminates (zeolites, alumina, silico-aluminophosphate), and sulfated zirconia. Many transition metal oxides are acidic, including titania, zirconia, and niobia.  Such acids are used in cracking. Many solid Brønsted acids are also employed industrially, including polystyrene sulfonate, solid phosphoric acid, niobic acid, and heteropolyoxometallates.

Applications 
Solid acids are used in catalysis in many industrial chemical processes, from large-scale catalytic cracking in petroleum refining to the synthesis of various fine chemicals.

One large scale application is alkylation, e.g., the combination of benzene and ethylene to give ethylbenzene. Another application is the rearrangement of cyclohexanone oxime to caprolactam.  Many alkylamines are prepared by amination of alcohols, catalyzed by solid acids.

Solid acids can be used as electrolytes in fuel cells.

References 

Acids
Acid–base chemistry
Acid catalysts